Baron Iván Skerlecz de Lomnicza (often rendered Ivan Škrlec Lomnički in Croatian; 20 July 1873 –  12 January 1951) was a Croatian ban (viceroy) between 21 July 1913, until 29 June 1917.

Skerlecz was born in Oroszló, Baranya County, Kingdom of Hungary in 1873. He was born into Šokci origin aristocratic family. His father was Baron Károly Skerlecz de Lomnicza (1836–1901), high sheriff (főszolgabíró) of Baranya county, ministerial councilor; his mother was the noble lady Sarolta Hrabovszky de Hrabova (1850–1931). His parernal grandfather was Baron Károly Skerlecz de Lomnicza (1793–1863), royal chamberlain, who received the title of baron on 22 August 1857. The Hungarian prime minister István Tisza appointed Skerlecz head of the Austro-Hungarian crown land in 1913, shortly before World War I.

While Croatia-Slavonia was not the site of any battles, Croatian troops, fighting under the Croatian Home Guard took part in the fighting, much of it in neighbouring Serbia. Skerlecz managed to reconvene the Croatian Sabor (parliament) in Zagreb by 1915. The Croats made further demands for local authority, as well as unification of Croatia-Slavonia with Dalmatia and Bosnia and Herzegovina. Stefan Sarkotić, Austria-Hungary's commander in Bosnia and Herzegovina also sought unification of their provinces. However, Austria-Hungary's outdated political system made any shifts between areas under Hungarian or Austrian spheres of influence difficult. Skerlecz could only support the Croatians in acting autonomously. As the war progressed more Croats found the formation of a South Slav state a potentially beneficial possibility.

He resigned from his post on June 29, 1917, after Tisza was ousted from power, leaving the country in no better state than when he had arrived. The Kingdom of Serbs, Croats and Slovenes was formed the following year. Skerlecz became persona non grata in Kingdom of Yugoslavia, because he was known as an ardent opponent of the involvement of Croatia in the newly formed Kingdom of Yugoslavia. Skerlecz had to return to Hungary where he died in Budapest in 1951.

Sources
 

1873 births
1951 deaths
People from Baranya County
Hungarian politicians
Bans of Croatia